Europe-Iran Forum is a series of events originally hosted by the Development Institute Paris, BHB Emissary and European Voice magazine in 2014. The event's main goal is to act as a non-partisan meeting ground for European and Iranian businesses to discuss future cooperation post sanctions.

Following the historic Joint Action Plan agreement reached by Iran and the Group P5+1 in November 2013, a series of economic sanctions were lifted, rekindling commercial interest in Iran throughout Europe.

The event, a first of its kind to offer Iran as a potential investment destination garnered attention in the press including the BBC. The Europe-Iran forum is the first event created by the private sector to have the moral support from the government of President Hassan Rouhani

Scheduled speakers included Martin Sorrell, chief executive of advertising group WPP, as well as Jack Straw and Hubert Vedrine, former British and French foreign ministers respectively. The Forum also has the blessing of Rouhani, whose chief of staff has written a letter of support to the organizers, media company European Voice.

The first post-sanctions conference was held in Vienna, Austria and second event has been slated for fall 2015 in the Swiss city of Geneva. The event's stated goal is to provide a platform for both Iranian and international banking and finance groups to discuss future cooperation post-sanctions.

The second forum was dubbed the Europe-Iran Forum, considering it was being held in the Swiss city of Geneva, and not in a European Union country.

Notable speakers

Jack Straw, former Labour Party British Foreign Secretary
Sir Martin Sorrell, CEO of advertising agency WPP plc
Rouzbeh Pirouz, founder of the Iranian Business School and Turquoise Partners
Neda Amidi, associate of the Plug & Play Tech Center in California
Parviz Aghili, CEO of Middle East Bank
Dominique de Villepin, former French foreign minister

Criticism

The event has come under heavy pressure from supporters of Israel for its pro-Iran stance. Israeli newspapers in 2014 slammed the event calling it a "travesty of the gravest proportions".

See also
Ravand Institute
Economy of Iran
Banking and Insurance in Iran
Tehran Stock Exchange
Tourism in Iran
Petroleum industry in Iran
Foreign direct investment in Iran

References

External links
Official website of the first post-sanctions conference - (Vienna, 23–24 July 2015)
Official website of the second post-sanctions conference - (Geneva, 24–25 September 2015)

Economy of Iran
Conferences in London
2015 conferences
Organizations related to the European Union
Iran–European Union relations